Coptops thibetana is a species of beetle in the family Cerambycidae. It was described by Stephan von Breuning in 1974, originally as C. thibetanus.

References

thibetana
Beetles described in 1974